This is a list of members of the International Olympic Committee. According to the Olympic Charter, the members of the IOC "represent and promote the interests of the IOC and of the Olympic Movement in their countries and in the organisations of the Olympic Movement in which they serve". Currently there are 99 members, 43 honorary members and one honour member.

Current members
The chairperson of an international organization, who represents an Olympic sport (e.g. the chairman of World Athletics), is represented in the IOC "ex officio" (i.e., because of that position).

 Athletes' Commission members are elected for eight-year terms.

Honorary Members
Most honorary members are former members who, after finishing their terms of office, are made honorary members.

Honour Member

Former members

Original members

References

External links
 IOC Members list

 
Members Of The International Olympic Committee